Pueraria mirifica, also known as กวาวเครือ Kwao Krua (among other names), is a plant found in northern and north eastern Thailand and Myanmar.

In Thailand, the plant is known as “Kwao Krua Kao”, the 'Kao' meaning white which distinguishes Pueraria mirifica from other plants with tuberous roots also sharing the 'Kwao Krua' designation such as Butea superba, commonly called Kwao Krua Deng (Red) and the 'black' and 'dull grey' Kwao Krua plants. The species was definitively identified as  Pueraria mirifica in 1952.

Dried and powdered, the tuberous root of Pueraria mirifica has a history of domestic consumption in Thailand in traditional folk medicine as a rejuvenating herb to promote youthfulness in both women and men and is used widely within the now government-regulated practice of traditional Thai medicine.

History 
Evidence of the use of Pueraria mirifica can be definitively identified as early as the 13th Century AD. The ancient capital of Burma, known then as Pookham but now called Bagan, was one of the most important centers of knowledge in the Asian region until being sacked and partially destroyed by Kublai Khan's Mongol invasion of the late 13th Century.  In 1931 a text was discovered secreted within the walls of a Buddhist temple that predated the Mongol invasion. Originally written on palm leaves, and translated into English and published in 1931, the document includes the instructions:
To take the tuberous root of Pueraria with big leaves, pound and blend with cow’s milk. The benefits of this medicine is to support memory, talk big, and be able to remember three books of the astrology, make the skin smooth like six year old kid, live more than 1,000 years and parasite diseases are not able to be of trouble.

Modern knowledge of Pueraria mirifica can be traced to the publication of the booklet containing the reference to the plant's use in ancient times, with the author Luang Anusan Suntara claiming in his publication use of the ingredient reduced wrinkles, got rid of gray hair, improved eyesight and memory, along with other benefits.

Two decades later in 1952 Pueraria mirifica was formally defined with its botanical nomenclature under the sponsorship of Dr. Kerr, the then Director of the Botanical Section of the Journal of the Siam Society.

Etymology  
The plant's specific name is derived from Latin mirificus 'wonderful', 'miraculous'.

Uses
Some herbal supplements claim various health benefits of the extracts of Pueraria mirifica including increasing breast size, skin, nail and hair health, reducing acne, balancing hormones and other rejuvenating effect. These claims are unsubstantiated and not backed by medical experts.

Chemical constituents 
Pueraria mirifica contains various phytoestrogens including deoxymiroestrol, daidzin, daidzein, genistin, genistein, coumestrol, kwakhurin, and mirificine, β-sitosterol, stigmasterol, campesterol, and mirificoumestan. There is contradictory evidence for the presence of miroestrol. It also contains the cytotoxic non-phytoestrogen spinasterol.

References

mirifica